Collita is a genus of moths in the family Erebidae. The genus was erected by Frederic Moore in 1878.

Most species were previously placed in the genus Eilema.

Species
 Collita chinensis (Daniel, 1954) (eastern Asia)
 Collita coreana (Leech, 1888) (eastern Asia)
 Collita digna (Ignatyev & Witt, 2007) (eastern Asia)
 Collita gina (Okano, [1955]) (eastern Asia: Japan)
 Collita griseola (Hübner, 1803) (northern Eurasia)
 Collita okanoi (Inoue, 1961) (eastern Asia: Japan and neighboring islands)
 Collita vetusta (Walker, 1854) (eastern Asia)

References

Ignatyev, N. N. & Witt, T. J. (2007). "A review of Eilema Hübner, 1819 of Russia and adjacent territories. Part 1. The Eilema griseola (Hübner, 1803) species group (Arctiidae: Lithosiinae)". Nota lepidopterologica 30 (1): 25–43.

Lithosiina
Moth genera